Jordan Michael Houston III (born April 5, 1975), known professionally as Juicy J, is an American rapper and record producer. Originally from Memphis, Tennessee, he is a founding member of the Southern hip hop group Three 6 Mafia, established in 1991. The group won an Academy Award for Best Original Song for their single "It's Hard out Here for a Pimp". His most notable singles as a soloist are his features on the Top 40 singles: Mike Will Made It's "23", Usher's "I Don't Mind" and his own single "Bandz a Make Her Dance" (featuring Lil Wayne and 2 Chainz), the last of which served as the lead single for his third album and major label debut Stay Trippy on August 27, 2013. The album was followed up by Rubba Band Business (2017), which was his final project on a major label before independently releasing his most recent album The Hustle Continues (2020).

In 2002, he released his solo debut album Chronicles of the Juice Man, in between Three 6 Mafia projects. In 2011, Juicy J announced that he was a part-owner and A&R representative for Wiz Khalifa's Taylor Gang Records, and the following year, he signed a solo deal with Columbia Records and Dr. Luke's Kemosabe Records. Juicy J received a Grammy Award nomination for his feature on the Katy Perry single "Dark Horse", which peaked at number one in the United States. He is the younger brother of frequent collaborator and fellow rapper Project Pat.

Early life 
Jordan Michael Houston III was born on April 5, 1975 in Memphis, Tennessee. As a teenager, he read a multitude of books and essays on the music industry, learning about marketing, publishing, and royalties. He looked up to fellow Tennessee artist, Al Bell, who was the brief co-owner of Stax Records. He wrote the song "Slob on My Knob" in 11th grade at North Side High School.

Career

1991–2009: Career beginnings with Three 6 Mafia 

In 1991, Juicy J was a co-founder of the Southern hip hop group now known as Three 6 Mafia. Along with DJ Paul and Lord Infamous, rappers Crunchy Black, Gangsta Boo and Koopsta Knicca. Alongside DJ Paul, Juicy J has launched Prophet Entertainment. In 1994, they left the label to their business partner Nick "Scarfo" Jackson and subsequently launched Hypnotize Minds. In 1995, the group released their first official album called Mystic Stylez. Since then the group has released 8 albums. On July 2, 2002, he released his solo debut studio album Chronicles of the Juice Man, under North North Records. In 2006, Juicy J, along with DJ Paul, Crunchy Black, and Frayser Boy, won an Academy Award for Best Original Song for "It's Hard out Here for a Pimp" at the 78th Academy Awards. On June 16, 2009, his second studio album Hustle Till I Die, was released under Hypnotize Minds and Select-O-Hits.

2010–2017: Taylor Gang, Stay Trippy and Rubba Band Business album 

From 2009 through 2011, Juicy J moved away from Three 6 Mafia, focusing on his solo career. During this time, he frequently collaborated with Wiz Khalifa, appearing on his mixtapes and releasing some of his own, including Blue Dream & Lean. In December 2011, Juicy J confirmed these rumors about him as the newest member of Wiz Khalifa's Taylor Gang imprint, a part-owner and A&R representative. In 2012, he was featured alongside his Taylor Gang label-mates, on the cover of Source Magazines May 2012 issue. In 2012, he released the lead single to his third album Stay Trippy, the chart topping "Bandz a Make Her Dance", which features guest appearances from 2 Chainz and Lil Wayne. The song was created in a two bedroom apartment in Washington, D.C. and was produced by Mike Will Made It. The song has peaked at number 29 on the US Billboard Hot 100.

In September 2012, Juicy J secured a recording contract with Columbia Records and Dr. Luke's Kemosabe Records. In November 2012, Juicy J announced his third studio album Stay Trippy would be released in 2013. He had shown some interest in working with Nas, Dr. Dre and Jay-Z on the album. He later announced that guest appearances on the album would include Wiz Khalifa, The Weeknd, Lil Wayne, 2 Chainz, Nicki Minaj, Chris Brown, Project Pat, Young Jeezy, Yelawolf and Big Sean. Juicy J  revealed the album would feature production from frequent collaborators Lex Luger, Sonny Digital, Mike Will Made It, Dr. Luke, and Crazy Mike.

On January 20, 2013, it was announced Juicy J would perform at the 2013 Paid Dues festival on March 30, 2013. On January 25, 2013, he released "Show Out" featuring Big Sean and Young Jeezy, as the second single from Stay Trippy. In June 2013, the album's third single "Bounce It", was released. The album was released on August 23, 2013, when it debuted at number 4 on the Billboard 200, with first-week sales of 64,000 copies in the United States. On September 10, 2013, Juicy J was featured in a song by Mike Will Made It which featured Miley Cyrus and Wiz Khalifa.

Juicy J was featured in Katy Perry's single "Dark Horse" from her fourth album Prism (2013). The song was released on September 17, 2013. "Dark Horse" was serviced to U.S. radio on December 17 as the album's third single. On January 7, 2014, Juicy J announced his fourth studio album would be released in 2014. Initially, he announced the title of this album would be The Hustle Continues. On January 30, 2013, Juicy J announced his "Never Sober" concert tour, which began on February 20, 2014. He was supported by Travis Scott and Project Pat on select dates.

On August 7, 2014, he released the song, titled "Low" featuring Nicki Minaj, Lil Bibby and Young Thug. On April 14, 2015, he released the song, titled "For Everybody" featuring Wiz Khalifa and R. City.

On August 5, 2016, Juicy J announced a new album Rubba Band Business (named after his acclaimed mixtape series) which was set to debut in the fall of 2016. He released a new single "No English" featuring Travis Scott. On September 28, 2016 Juicy J released a new song "Ballin" with Kanye West on the hook. On November 21, 2016, Juicy J premiered a new song, "Gimme Gimme" featuring Slim Jxmmi of Rae Sremmurd, prod. by Mike Will Made It and Resource of Ear Drummers.

On September 18, 2017, Juicy J released a mixtape called Highly Intoxicated featuring production largely by rap duo Suicideboys, to whom he has acted as an idol and mentor. On December 8, 2017, Juicy J released the Rubba Band Business album.

2018–present: New label and The Hustle Continues 
Throughout late 2018 and 2019, he released the standalone singles "Neighbor" featuring Travis Scott, "Let Me See" featuring Lil Skies and Kevin Gates, and "Three Point Stance" featuring City Girls and Megan Thee Stallion. The songs failed to gain traction commercially and Juicy J was granted release from his recording contract from Columbia Records. On July 31, 2020, Juicy J announced his fifth studio album would be called The Hustle Continues (previously used for a prior scrapped 2014 album title) and released "Gah Damn High" featuring Wiz Khalifa as the lead single through his new label Entertainment One.

Personal life 
In July 2016, Houston married longtime girlfriend Regina Perera. They have a daughter who was born in 2018 and a son born in 2020.

Discography 

Chronicles of the Juice Man (2002)
Hustle Till I Die (2009)
Stay Trippy (2013)
Rubba Band Business (2017)
The Hustle Continues (2020)

Awards and nominations

References

External links 
 
 Juicy J at Discogs
 

1975 births
Living people
A&R people
African-American record producers
American hip hop record producers
African-American male rappers
African-American male songwriters
American music industry executives
Best Original Song Academy Award-winning songwriters
Businesspeople from Tennessee
Columbia Records artists
Gangsta rappers
Horrorcore artists
Rappers from Memphis, Tennessee
Songwriters from Tennessee
Southern hip hop musicians
Three 6 Mafia members
21st-century American rappers
MTV Europe Music Award winners
Trap musicians
Twitch (service) streamers